Arnold Ventures LLC (formerly known as The Laura and John Arnold Foundation) is focused on evidence-based giving in a wide range of categories including: criminal justice, education, health care, and public finance. The organization was founded by billionaires John D. Arnold and Laura Arnold in 2010. 

The fund has invested in and funded a wide range of studies and programs in the areas of health care (opioids, contraceptive choice and access, drug prices, commercial sector prices, complex care), education reform, criminal justice, and improving reproducibility and transparency in science through the funding of open science and metascience.

History
The Laura and John Arnold Foundation was initially created as a philanthropic organization, but was restructured as a limited liability company (LLC) and renamed Arnold Ventures in January 2019. The  transition was made in order to combine the Arnolds efforts as many foundations are limited to only making grants to recognized 501(c)(3) nonprofits. Arnold Ventures donates and spends money through a private foundation, a donor-advised fund, and a 501(c)(4). The organizations' limited liability company form allows the firm to operate in a much faster and more cohesive fashion.

Since 2010, the foundation has invested more than $1 billion in a variety of initiatives, focusing on pretrial and criminal justice, health care, prescription drug prices, the quality of academic research, combating predatory higher education practices, the evaluation of social programs, school system governance, and electoral reform. The organization focuses on using expert research and statistical analysis to guide its efforts in creating systemic social change. As of 2021, Arnold Ventures made over $1 billion in grants, distributed as follows: $316 million for criminal justice, $425 million for education, $347 million for health, and $165 million for public finance. In August 2012, the foundation launched the Giving Library to help other philanthropists make their gifts more efficient and effective. Arnold Ventures has published guidelines, based on the Open Science Framework, that anybody seeking research funding from them must follow.

In 2018, the organization gave away $204.3 million, focused on the areas of health care, education, criminal justice, and public finance.
In January 2019, the Laura and John Arnold Foundation was restructured as an LLC and renamed Arnold Ventures. The  transition was made in order to combine the Arnolds efforts as many foundations are limited to only making grants to recognized 501(c)(3) nonprofits. Arnold Ventures donates and spends money through a private foundation, a donor-advised fund, and a 501(c)(4).

The Arnolds were among the first to sign the Giving Pledge in 2008, a pledge by some high-net-worth individuals to donate a large percentage of their income to philanthropic causes during their lifetimes.

Areas of focus
The Arnolds have used an investment management approach to giving. Meaning that the foundation targeted a large portion of its giving to higher risk efforts that the Arnold's viewed as having a higher potential to drive change over the long term and then some portion of its giving to low risk, well-established institutions to help maintain their efforts

Criminal justice
As of 2021, Arnold Ventures allocated $316 million in grants for its criminal justice initiative. An overview of criminal justice reform in the United States by GiveWell listed the Arnold Foundation as one of the top foundations in the United States working in the area.

Partnerships 
In March 2019, Arnold Ventures announced the opening of the National Partnership for Pretrial Justice, focused on bringing together individuals and organizations from every constituency affected by pretrial policies. By November 2020, the organization had committed $48 million to the Partnership. Arnold Ventures also supports the Council on Criminal Justice, a bipartisan reform group formed in 2019 in order to improve the criminal justice system. The Council grew out of the federal First Step Act and its two initial research projects were to explore incarceration trends by race and gender; and, examine the fallout from the 1994 Crime Bill.

Gun Violence Research 
In July 2019, Arnold Ventures provided $9.8 million for 17 research grants awarded by the National Collaborative on Gun Violence Research. The grant awardees are studying a range of topics that includes background check laws, the role of firearms in domestic violence, gun-carrying by high-risk youth, and police training for high-stakes situations.

Prison violence and health 
In June 2020, the organization donated $2.7 million to the University of California, Irvine (UCI) to conduct a study into the sources and consequences of prison violence in seven states. The goal of the three-year, multi-strategy study is to create an evidence-based framework for reducing and preventing incidents of violence. The seven states participating in the study are Arizona, Colorado, Massachusetts, Ohio, Oregon, Pennsylvania, and Texas.

As of April 2021, the organization had committed $7.8 million to COVID-related criminal justice grants supporting goals such as alternatives to arrest, pretrial reforms, and release of vulnerable inmates.

Data-Driven Justice 
The Foundation funded Data-Driven Justice, a program to identify repeat low-level offenders suffering from drug abuse or mental illness, and the treatment options and intervention points that work to address their needs. The program was started by the Obama administration in 2016. In 2018, the Foundation pledged $1.6 million for several Data-Driven Justice pilot programs in Middlesex County in Massachusetts; Long Beach, California; and Johnson County, Iowa.

In May 2018, the Foundation announced $4.1 million in grants to help communities address “frequent utilizers” - people who cycle between jails and hospitals on a steady basis. They included $1.6 million for pilot programs to test new methods of coordination between police, hospitals, and social services; $2.1 million to fund evaluations of intervention programs; and $375,000 to the National Association of Counties to organize county leaders to focus on the issues.

The Foundation also supported the University of Rochester Medical Center, the City of Long Beach, and MDRC with grants to evaluate their interventions and research into what actually works to address frequent utilizers’ needs.

In 2011, the Vice President of Criminal Justice at the then LJAF, former New Jersey Attorney General Anne Milgram, led a team in creating a risk assessment instrument, the Public Safety Assessment (PSA), for courts to use as part of their pretrial release systems. The Leadership Conference Education Fund published a statement about their support for ending secured money bail and the principles that pretrial risk assessments should ensure if they are necessary to be used.

In 2017, a family whose son was allegedly murdered by a man granted pretrial release submitted a complaint against the PSA. In 2020, a U.S. Appellate Court supported the District Court's dismissal of the complaint. In 2019, the Metropolitan Crime Commission released a report calling the "public safety assessment tool" a "waste of money" and concluded that the tool "underrates the risk offenders pose to public safety." The foundation remains a partner for the Data Collaborative for Justice.

In 2016, the foundation donated $360,000 to a trial of continuous aerial surveillance using drones of Baltimore, Maryland. The project was funded by the LLC and was implemented without approval from the city’s Board of Estimates and without the knowledge of then-Mayor Stephanie Rawlings-Blake, the Baltimore City Council, or State’s Attorney Marilyn Mosby. The ACLU filed a lawsuit on behalf of the Leaders of a Beautiful Struggle, an activist group concerned about privacy violations. A federal appeals court ruled the use of drones was constitutional, but Arnold Ventures halted funding for the drone program’s expansion into St. Louis.

In 2019, the Foundation committed $17 million in grants to study prisons in the U.S. and how they can be a more effective part of the criminal justice system.

Education
According to their list of grants, they have spent $425 million on grants related to education as of 2020.

In May 2012, Reuters reported that the Laura and John Arnold Foundation had committed $20 million over a five-year period to an initiative called StudentsFirst, led by Michelle Rhee, who used to head the Washington D.C. public school system.

On June 26, 2012, the foundation launched the ERIN Project, a tool to help analyze the national K-12 education landscape.

Arnold Ventures partnered with other organizations to create the nonprofit The City Fund in 2018. It works with cities and school systems to improve public schools using the portfolio model. Under this model, school systems invest in schools that deliver good results, while closing or changing schools that don’t. The City Fund raised nearly $200 million in its first year.

In March 2020, Arnold Ventures gave $3 million to The City Fund to help schools during the coronavirus pandemic. The money was distributed between the 14 cities where the group has active grants.

Public finance and democracy
In 2016 and 2018 the foundation was part of a group that donated $40 million towards ending gerrymandering, and implementing open primaries and ranked choice voting. In 2018, Arnold Ventures partnered with six other organizations on a research initiative to increase public understanding of Facebook’s role in elections and democracy. The organizations sponsored an independent committee of scholars that invited researchers to conduct research using proprietary Facebook data. The Social Science Research Council oversaw the selection of research proposals and the peer-review process.

The foundation has funded various politically-oriented 501(c)4 organizations. Many of the organizations funded focus on tax and retirement policies.

LJAF's attempts at pension reform have been met with hostility by some. However, the Foundation’s efforts haven’t been to eliminate pensions, but to identify where existing systems have failed and provide options for new, viable funding systems. Even critics recognize that there is a need for reform. In 2014, public pension systems faced shortfalls of more than $1 trillion; these shortfalls had contributed to two cities in California and Michigan filing for bankruptcy.

In July 2014, the Arnold Foundation donated $2.8 million to the Center for Public Integrity to launch a new project focused on state campaign finance. The Foundation also provided funds to various think tanks and research institutes focused on public pension, both those who advocate for the current system, such as the libertarian Reason Foundation, and those focused on other solutions, like the Boston College’s Center for Retirement Research. In 2016, the Foundation and unions in Arizona both supported a ballot measure that reduced cost-of-living payments to retired police and firefighters.

Health Care 
By 2020, Arnold Ventures had donated $347million to address concerns with health care organizations. This included funds for the Center for Healthcare Transparency ($5.67 million), Nutrition Science Initiative ($23.19 million), and the Research Triangle Institute ($1.67 million). Arnold Ventures was one of three organizations to invest in Civica RX, a nonprofit focused on driving down drug costs. Fifty large hospital systems partnered with Civica RX.

Arnold Ventures donated $27.6 million to the Institute for Clinical and Economic Review (ICER), roughly 69 percent of its funding. ICER is a nonprofit that does cost-analysis of prescription drugs and medical tests and procedures to determine a value for each treatment. ICER uses the quality-adjusted life year (QALY) and the Equal Value of Life Years Gained (evLYG) to determine if a treatment adds valuable years to the patient's life. Arnold Ventures’ work through ICER has been praised by those seeking to standardize drug pricing, but criticized by those who fear that ICER’s reviews are not peer reviewed and could limit investment in medications for elderly patients or those with rare diseases.

In January 2021, the organization helped fund the Action Collaborative on Countering the U.S. Opioid Epidemic. The Collaborative was formed by the National Academy of Medicine and the Aspen Institute to address the COVID-19 risks faced by people with substance use disorders and chronic pain.

Research integrity

One of the first projects funded by the foundation was research into obesity, which was drawn to Arnold's attention when he heard an interview with Gary Taubes on the EconTalk podcast. Subsequent conversation between Arnold and Taubes led to the foundation making a $4.7 million seed grant to the Nutrition Science Initiative (NuSI) in San Diego, a nonprofit cofounded by Taubes where he and Peter Attia are trying to find the cause of obesity. The following year, the foundation promised an additional $35.5 million. The foundation also funds The Nutrition Coalition (TNC), which works to reshape the process by which the Dietary Guidelines for America are formulated.

The foundation also funded the launch of the Center for Open Science with a $5.25 million grant and by 2017 had provided an additional $10 million in funding. Among other projects, the Center has been responsible for a few reproducibility projects - reviewing published scientific research in order to see if all reported findings can be confirmed.

The foundation also funded the launch of the Meta-Research Innovation Center at Stanford at Stanford University run by John Ioannidis and Steven Goodman to study ways to improve scientific research; and provided funding for the AllTrials initiative led in part by Ben Goldacre.

As of 2017 it had given around $80 million in grants under its "Research Integrity" initiative.

References

External links
 

Foundations based in the United States
Organizations established in 2010
Philanthropic organizations based in the United States
2010 establishments in the United States